Moechotypa diphysis is a species of beetle in the family Cerambycidae. It was described by Pascoe in 1871. It is known from Russia, China, Japan, North Korea, and South Korea. It feeds on plants such as Ailanthus altissima, Juglans regia, Zanthoxylum simulans, and Quercus glauca.

References

diphysis
Beetles described in 1871